Hoho is one of the  smallest villages in the municipality of Laukaa in Keski-Suomi, Finland, near Lievestuore village. 
Hoho and Metsolahti are the southernmost villages of Laukaa. Hoho's name comes from the Hoho river that flows through the village to Lievestuore lake. The most famous person of Hoho was Sylvi Saimo, who was Olympic gold medalist in canoeing and a politician. Hoho had its own school until 2001.

References

Populated places in Finland
Laukaa